On The Trail Of The Golden Owl is a French armchair treasure hunt book created by communications expert Régis Hauser under the pseudonym "Max Valentin" and illustrated by artist Michel Becker. The book was first published in 1993. It provides clues to the location of a buried statuette of an owl, created by Becker.

, the puzzle contained within the book remains officially unsolved, making it the second longest-running contest in the armchair treasure hunt genre. Hauser died in 2009.

A new edition of On The Trail Of The Golden Owl written by Michel Becker was published in December 2019, called The Secret Notebooks (4th edition 2019).

In 2021 Michel Becker became the official organiser of the treasure hunt, obtaining the sealed envelope containing the hunt solution from the family of Régis Hauser. Becker journeyed with a legal bailiff to check that the owl prize was still buried at the location revealed in the solution. He reported that when he dug at the spot he found the owl missing and instead found a rusty iron bird. He replaced this rusty bird with a new bronze owl so that the treasure hunt could continue. Becker has published clarified game rules and published a 5th edition of the clue book, On the trail of the Golden Owl – Under the seal of secrecy in August 2022.

Origins

On The Trail Of The Golden Owl was Max Valentin's first treasure hunt. He came up with the idea for the puzzle in the late 1970s, and spent 450 hours designing eleven textual riddles, which together hold the clues to a final location and a cache, hidden somewhere in France.

Michel Becker created eleven paintings for the book, as well as the final prize, the Golden Owl statuette. The statuette is 10 inches (25 cm) high and 20 inches (50 cm) wide, and weighs 33 lbs (15 kg). It is entirely made of gold and silver, with diamonds on the head. A legal protector holds it in Paris. Becker also created a replica made of bronze, which was buried somewhere in France by Hauser on the night of 23 April 1993. The treasure hunt was launched on 15 May 1993.

Valentin designed the hunt to last for a few months and to be solvable by experts or amateurs, insisting that "If all the searchers put all their knowledge together, the owl would be found in....two hours". Valentin also included false trails in the riddles, which he admitted was normal in treasure hunt games, but which he later regretted putting too much work into. He estimated that the hunt would last between four months and a year.

Valentin later created more than twenty other treasure hunts, all of which have been resolved.

Riddles
The book consists of eleven double-page spreads, each of which is a discrete riddle composed of a title, text, and a painting. Each pair of pages is numbered with a wavelength associated with its colors, and with an owl face.

Notes

Original Order, as published: 500, 530, 780, 600, B, 420, 520, 650, 470, 560, and 580.
B Order, by solving the B riddle: B, 530, 780, 470, 580, 600, 500, 420, 560, 650, and 520.

Additional clues
After releasing the book, Max Valentin gave some general clues about the game. These clues were often short riddles, or plays on words. 
Some of the clues were refutations; readers were looking for the owl in erroneous places such as Mont Saint-Michel and at Notre Dame de Paris, and Valentin felt the need to publicly dismiss these solutions. He also published new clues, in the form of two cards – one global, one precise – that lead to the final zone and the buried owl. He also said that the owl was not on an island, and that it is buried at least 100 kilometers (62 miles) inland.

On 3 June 1993, Valentin created a Minitel server, 'MaxVal', in order to answer public questions about the game. During the following eight-year period, he answered nearly 100,000 questions. The subjects were various, and Valentin detailed many parts of the game, including the elements of the final zone, and the techniques needed to interpret the eleven riddles. Valentin closed the server on 13 December 2001, commenting that it had represented the highest level of "intelligence per square centimetre" in France.

Three specific techniques were confirmed by Valentin before his death:
The use of maps. The reader must do something with a map, to reveal the final zone of the game, then use a precise map of that zone to find the cache that contains the owl.
The existence of a "mega trick", which is the key to using the sequence of eleven riddles to identify the final zone. Many readers had already reached the conclusion that such a technique must exist.
 The existence of a final, hidden riddle that completes the game. When a reader finds this riddle in the final zone, he or she will be able to utilise elements of the previous riddles to form and solve the last riddle. The decryption of the last riddle will lead to the cache that contains the owl.

In 1995, Valentin said that the book's readers have collectively got 95% of the solution, but as they are not sharing and communicating their solutions, they can't get the last 5%.

In 1996, Valentin said that the "remainders" are the key to the owl, and that they can be found in the decryption of some of the ten riddles that have wavelengths.

Theories

Lawsuits
Hauser ("Max Valentin") died in 2009, leaving the secret to the puzzle inside a sealed envelope. The solutions are now held by his lawyer.

In 2004, the original publisher of the book went bankrupt, and The Golden Owl statuette was seized as part of its liquidation. The creators recovered it in 2008.

In 2011, Michel Becker, the co-creator of the hunt, claimed sole ownership of the Golden Owl statuette, and intended to sell it. Two judicial decisions stopped this from taking place. The treasure-hunter association A2CO played an important role in the preservation of the prize, and the whole community raised petitions to support A2CO's lawyers.

Legacy
The creators of Montecrypto: The Bitcoin Enigma, a treasure hunt game released on 20 February 2018 which offered a prize of 1 Bitcoin to the winning player, cited On the Trail of the Golden Owl.

See also
 Masquerade, a 1979 book credited with popularizing the armchair treasure hunt genre
 The Secret (treasure hunt), a similar concept by publisher Byron Preiss begun in 1982 and still not completely solved
 Treasure: In Search of the Golden Horse, a 1984 multimedia treasure-hunting puzzle

References

External links
 Information (English)
 Additional information (French)
 Public Answers Database (French) (requires login)
 Riddles Synthesis (French)

Puzzle books
Puzzle hunts
Word puzzles
Logic puzzles
Outdoor locating games